Erick Augusto Mejia (born November 9, 1994) is a Dominican professional baseball infielder and outfielder in the Washington Nationals organization. He has played in Major League Baseball (MLB) for the Kansas City Royals.

Career

Seattle Mariners
Mejia was signed as an international free agent by the Seattle Mariners on June 30, 2012. Mejia played in the Seattle organization from 2013 through 2015. During his time with them, he played for the DSL Mariners, AZL Mariners, Everett AquaSox, Clinton LumberKings, and the Tacoma Rainiers.

Los Angeles Dodgers
Mejia was traded to the Los Angeles Dodgers in exchange for Joe Wieland on January 12, 2016. He was a post-season all-star with the Rancho Cucamonga Quakes in 2016 when he hit .287 in 124 games. He split the 2017 season between Rancho Cucamonga and the Tulsa Drillers.

Kansas City Royals
On January 4, 2018, Mejia was traded to the Kansas City Royals in a three team trade that  also sent Jake Peter and Scott Alexander to the Dodgers, Joakim Soria, Luis Avilán, and cash considerations to the Chicago White Sox and Trevor Oaks to the Royals. Mejia spent the 2018 season with the Northwest Arkansas Naturals, hitting .263/.318/.367/.685 with 5 home runs and 59 RBI. He spent the 2019 minor league season with the Omaha Storm Chasers, hitting .271/.338/.382/.720 with 7 home runs and 63 RBI.

On September 3, 2019, the Royals selected Mejia's contract and promoted him to the major leagues. He made his major league debut on September 5 versus the Detroit Tigers. On December 2, 2019, Mejia was non-tendered and became a free agent, but re-signed with the Royals on a minor league contract on December 17.

Overall with the 2020 Kansas City Royals, Mejia batted .071 with no home runs and 0 RBIs in 8 games. On December 2, Mejia was nontendered by the Royals. On December 21, 2020, Mejia re-signed with the Royals on a minor league contract. Mejia spent the 2021 season with Triple-A Omaha. He played in 55 games, hitting .246 with 7 home runs and 30 RBI's. He became a free agent following the 2021 season.

Seattle Mariners (second stint)
On February 12, 2022, Mejia signed a minor league contract with the Seattle Mariners. He elected free agency on November 10, 2022.

Washington Nationals
On November 19, 2022, Mejia signed a minor league deal with the Washington Nationals.

References

External links

1994 births
Living people
People from Santo Domingo Province
Baseball players at the 2020 Summer Olympics
Medalists at the 2020 Summer Olympics
Olympic medalists in baseball
Olympic bronze medalists for the Dominican Republic
Dominican Republic expatriate baseball players in the United States
Major League Baseball players from the Dominican Republic
Major League Baseball outfielders
Major League Baseball infielders
Kansas City Royals players
Dominican Summer League Mariners players
Arizona League Mariners players
Everett AquaSox players
Clinton LumberKings players
Tacoma Rainiers players
Rancho Cucamonga Quakes players
Tulsa Drillers players
Northwest Arkansas Naturals players
Omaha Storm Chasers players
Águilas Cibaeñas players
Olympic baseball players of the Dominican Republic